Mary Holland (19 June 1935 – 7 June 2004) was an Irish journalist who specialised in writing about Ireland and in particular Northern Ireland. Born in Dover but raised in Ireland, she married a British diplomat, Ronald Higgins; they lived in Indonesia but the marriage was annulled.

She originally worked in fashion for Vogue magazine and then The Observer. She came to prominence as one of the first Irish journalists to report on the rise of the Northern Ireland Civil Rights Association and became an increasingly prominent commentator on the affairs of the region.

In 1977 Conor Cruise O'Brien was appointed editor-in-chief of the paper. O'Brien was a writer and politician who served as a government minister in the Oireachtas (Irish Parliament). He was often criticized for his uncompromising opposition to "physical force Irish republicanism", and his actions to that end during Liam Cosgrave's tenure as Taoiseach were labelled as censorship by some. Shortly after starting as editor, O'Brien sent a memo to Holland:  Holland subsequently left The Observer and joined The Irish Times as their Northern Ireland correspondent.

In 1988, she witnessed the IRA Corporals killings.

Her awards included the Prix Italia award for her television documentary on the Creggan in Derry (Creggan, 1980) and, in 1989, the Ewart-Biggs memorial prize for the promotion of peace and understanding in Ireland. She wrote and campaigned for abortion rights in Ireland and disclosed, in an article on the topic of abortion, that she had had one.

Death
She died twelve days before her 69th birthday from scleroderma, and is survived by her children with fellow journalist Eamonn McCann: Kitty and Luke, both of who are also journalists.

References

External links
Guardian obituary
Address by Mary Robinson at the inaugural Mary Holland Commemorative Lecture, 7 July 2005
Tributes to Mary Holland

1935 births
2004 deaths
Christopher Ewart-Biggs Memorial Prize recipients
Irish women journalists
The Irish Times people
The Observer people
Deaths from scleroderma